The Downe Township School District is a community public school district that serves students in pre-kindergarten through eighth grade from Downe Township, in Cumberland County, New Jersey, United States.

As of the 2018–19 school year, the district, comprising one school, had an enrollment of 186 students and 17.0 classroom teachers (on an FTE basis), for a student–teacher ratio of 10.9:1. In the 2016–17 school year, Downe had the 38th smallest enrollment of any school district in the state, with 185 students.

The district is classified by the New Jersey Department of Education as being in District Factor Group "A", the lowest of eight groupings. District Factor Groups organize districts statewide to allow comparison by common socioeconomic characteristics of the local districts. From lowest socioeconomic status to highest, the categories are A, B, CD, DE, FG, GH, I, and J.

Public school students in ninth through twelfth grades attend Bridgeton High School in Bridgeton, as part of a sending/receiving relationship with the Bridgeton Public Schools. As of the 2018–19 school year, the high school had an enrollment of 1,404 students and 112.0 classroom teachers (on an FTE basis), for a student–teacher ratio of 12.5:1.

School
Downe Township School had an enrollment of 183 students in grades PreK-8 for the 2018–19 school year.
Sherri Miller, Principal

Administration
Core members of the district's administration are:
Sherri Miller, Superintendent
Lisa DiNovi, Business Administrator / Board Secretary

Board of education
The district's board of education, with nine members, sets policy and oversees the fiscal and educational operation of the district through its administration. As a Type II school district, the board's trustees are elected directly by voters to serve three-year terms of office on a staggered basis, with three seats up for election each year held (since 2012) as part of the November general election. The board appoints a superintendent to oversee the day-to-day operation of the district.

References

External links
Downe Township School

School Data for the Downe Township School, National Center for Education Statistics

Downe Township, New Jersey
New Jersey District Factor Group A
School districts in Cumberland County, New Jersey